The 1919 United Kingdom railway strike was an industrial dispute which lasted nine days (midnight 26–27 September until 5 October) leading to a victory by the National Union of Railwaymen.

The strike was precipitated when the government announced plans to reduce rates of pay which had been negotiated by ASLEF and NUR during the First World War. After nine days of strike action, the government agreed to maintain wages for another year. Subsequent negotiations resulted in the standardisation of wages across the railway companies and the introduction of a maximum eight hour day.

References

National Union of Railwaymen
Rail transport strikes
1919 in the United Kingdom
1919 labor disputes and strikes
Labour disputes in the United Kingdom
1919 in rail transport